The Æcerbot (Old English for "Field-Remedy") is an Anglo-Saxon metrical charm recorded in the 11th century, intended to remedy fields that yielded poorly.

Overview
The charm consists of a partially Christianized prayer and a day-long ritual that began at night with four sods taken from the field, to the root-mats of which a poultice was applied in the form of yeast, honey, oil and milk mixed with parts of all the good herbs that grew, save buckwheat and woody plants. In Christian times the sods were taken to mass and returned to the field before nightfall, each with a small cross planted in it. This was the extent to which the ritual was Christianized. Once more in the field, the healer faced the east, where the sun would rise, turning three times clockwise and calling upon the "holy guardian of the heavenly kingdom" to "fill the earth", that the crops would grow. A plough was then anointed with a "hallowed" mix of oil, paste, frankincense, salt and fennel, of which the imported frankincense lent a Christian element; a chant was then sung, beginning , erce, erce eorþan modor (earth's mother)". The field was then ploughed with a chant hailing "Erce, eorthan modor."

The significance of erce has been the subject of scholarly commentary and speculation. Grimm connected Old High German erchan "genuine, true".

Kathleen Herbert observes that in the first mention of the Angli, Tacitus in his Germania, remarks that "the noteworthy characteristic of the English, to foreign eyes, was that they were goddess-worshippers; they looked on the earth as their mother." Herbert links Tacitus' mention of the Angli to the later English "Æcerbot". Herbert comments that while "Æcerbot" is referred to as a charm, it is in fact a "full-scale ritual" that would take an entire day to perform, plus additional time for collecting and preparing the materials necessary.

See also
"Nine Herbs Charm"
"Wið færstice"

External links 

 Text

 This charm is edited, annotated and linked to digital images of its manuscript pages, with translation, in the Old English Poetry in Facsimile Project: https://oepoetryfacsimile.org/

Notes

References

Grigsby, John (2005). Beowulf & Grendel: The Truth Behind England's Oldest Legend. Sterling Publishing Company, Inc. 
Gordon, R. K. (1962). Anglo-Saxon Poetry. Everyman's Library #794. M. Dent & Sons, LTD.
Herbert, Kathleen (2007). Looking for the Lost Gods of England. Anglo-Saxon Books. 
Hill, Thomas D., “The Æcerbot Charm and its Christian User,” Anglo-Saxon England 6 (1977), 213-21
Jolly, Karen, Popular Religion in Late Saxon England: Elf Charms in Context. University of North Carolina Press, 1996
Niles, John D., “The Æcerbot Ritual in Context,” in Old English Literature in Context: Ten Essays, ed. John D. Niles (Cambridge: D. S. Brewer, 1980), pp. 44-56
Rosenberg, Bruce A., “The Meaning of Æcerbot,” Journal of American Folklore 79 (1966), 428-436

Further reading
 Duckert, Audrey R. (1972). "Erce and Other Possibly Keltic Elements In the Old English Charm for Unfruitful Land". In: Names (A Journal of Onomastics), 20:2, pp. 83-90. DOI: 10.1179/nam.1972.20.2.83

Anglo-Saxon metrical charms